Wilhelm Wirtinger (19 July 1865 – 16 January 1945) was an Austrian mathematician, working in complex analysis, geometry, algebra, number theory, Lie groups and knot theory.

Biography

He was born at Ybbs on the Danube and studied at the University of Vienna, where he received his doctorate in 1887, and his habilitation in 1890. Wirtinger was greatly influenced by Felix Klein with whom he studied at the University of Berlin and the University of Göttingen.

Honours

In 1907 the Royal Society of London awarded him the Sylvester Medal, for his contributions to the general theory of functions.

Work

Research activity

He worked in many areas of mathematics, publishing 71 works. His first significant work, published in 1896, was on theta functions. He proposed as a generalization of eigenvalues, the concept of the spectrum of an operator, in an 1897 paper; the concept was further extended by David Hilbert and now it forms the main object of investigation in the field of spectral theory. Wirtinger also contributed papers on complex analysis, geometry, algebra, number theory, and Lie groups. He collaborated with Kurt Reidemeister on knot theory, showing in 1905 how to compute the knot group. Also, he was one of the editors of the Analysis section of Klein's encyclopedia.

During a conversation, Wirtinger attracted the attention of Stanisław Zaremba to a particular boundary value problem, which later became known as the mixed boundary value problem.

Teaching activity
A partial list of his students includes the following scientists: 

 
Wilhelm Blaschke
Hilda Geiringer
Kurt Gödel
Wilhelm Gross
Eduard Helly

Erwin Schrödinger
 
Olga Taussky-Todd
Leopold Vietoris
Roland Weitzenböck

Selected publications

, available at DigiZeitschirften. In this important paper, Wirtinger introduces several important concepts in the theory of functions of several complex variables, namely Wirtinger derivatives and the tangential Cauchy–Riemann condition. The paper is deliberately written from a formal point of view, i.e. without giving a rigorous derivation of the properties deduced.
.
.

See also 
 Wirtinger inequality (2-forms)

Notes

Biographical references
, available at DigiZeitschirften. An ample commemorative paper containing a list of Wirtinger's publications.

External links

 from the ICMI History of ICMI Web site.

19th-century Austrian mathematicians
Austro-Hungarian mathematicians
1865 births
1945 deaths
Royal Medal winners
University of Vienna alumni
20th-century Austrian mathematicians
People from Melk District
Academic staff of the University of Innsbruck
Academic staff of the University of Vienna